Peter Lewis (born 1 February 1990) is an Australian professional racing cyclist. He rode at the 2015 UCI Track Cycling World Championships.

References

External links

1990 births
Living people
Australian male cyclists
Sportspeople from Newcastle, New South Wales